The Gentle Terror is a 1961 British thriller film directed by Frank Marshall.

Plot
A mild mannered bookkeeping clerk (Terence Alexander) is accused of embezzlement. To clear his name he must catch the true culprit.

Cast

 Terence Alexander as David
 Angela Douglas as Nancy
 Jill Hyem as Daphne
 Laidman Browne as Byrne
 Malcolm Webster as Ian
 Patrick McAlinney as Sam
 Victor Spinetti as Joe
 Peter Swanwick as 1st Auditor	
 Howard Greene as 2nd Auditor	
  Rosemary Rothery as Miss Durant	
 John Hatton as Frank	
 Paul Craig as Lou	
 Fredric Abbott as Barman	
 Jack Melford as Inspector Miles
 Michael Beint as Det. Sgt. Harris	
 George Mikell as Turk	
 Michael Darbyshire as Ticket Clerk	
 Totti Truman Taylor as Mrs. Connor

References

External links
 

1961 films
British thriller films
1960s thriller films
Films shot at New Elstree Studios
1960s English-language films
1960s British films